Tadas Sedekerskis (born January 17, 1998) is a Lithuanian professional basketball player for Cazoo Baskonia of the Liga ACB and the EuroLeague.

Professional career
During his early career at age of just thirteen Sedekerskis played for Kuršiai Neringa in the third-tier Lithuanian basketball league – RKL, averaging 10.6 points, 3.8 rebounds and 1.8 assists per 27 minutes. The following season, he joined NKL club Klaipėdos Nafta-Universitetas. In 2013, Sedekerskis signed a "1+2+3" contract with Baskonia of Spain. On May 10, 2014 Sedekerskis led Baskonia's junior team to a bronze medal after scoring 34 points (2-pointers: 7/10, 3-pointers: 4/11, FT: 8/11), grabbing 10 rebounds and making two steals. At the age of only 17, he debuted in Baskonia's men's team during a Liga ACB win against Joventut Badalona by 87–68.

He tallied four points and a team-high five rebounds as a member of the World Select Team at the 2017 Nike Hoop Summit.

On September 1, 2017, Sedekerskis extended his contract with Baskonia until 2022 and went on loan to San Pablo Burgos for the 2017–18 season. On December 16, 2017, Sedekerskis end his loan with San Pablo Burgos after appearing inconspicuously in eight games with Spanish club and went on loan to Nevėžis of the Lietuvos krepšinio lyga. In April 2019, he declared for the 2019 NBA draft. On July 26, 2019, Baskonia loaned him to Neptūnas for the 2019–20 season. On July 27, 2021, Sedekerskis signed a contract extension with Baskonia until the end of the 2023–24 season.

National team career
In 2013, Sedekerskis was a member of the Lithuanian U-16 team during the 2013 European Under-16 Championship. He averaged 11.4 points, 4.9 rebounds and 1 assist per 20 minutes of game action. In 2015, he represented Lithuania's U-18 team in the 2015 FIBA Europe Under-18 Championship and averaged 12.6 points, 7.0 rebounds and 2.3 assists per game. The team, led by him and Martynas Varnas, Laurynas Birutis, won bronze. The trio was invited to play in the FIBA's Youth All-Star Game during EuroBasket 2015.

He averaged a double-double with 15.7 points and 10.2 rebounds to go along with 3.8 assists, 1.3 blocks and 1.2 steals per outing en route to a silver medal at the 2016 U18 European Championships in Turkey. Sedekerskis was named to the tournament’s "All-Star Five".

References

External links
 Tadas Sedekerskis at acb.com 
 Tadas Sedekerskis at eurobasket.com
 Tadas Sedekerskis at euroleague.net
 Tadas Sedekerskis at fiba.com
 

1998 births
Living people
Araberri BC players
BC Neptūnas players
BC Nevėžis players
CB Miraflores players
CB Peñas Huesca players
Lithuanian expatriate basketball people in Spain
Liga ACB players
Lithuanian men's basketball players
People from Klaipėda County
Power forwards (basketball)
Saski Baskonia players
Small forwards